The following is a list of Teen Choice Award winners and nominees for Choice Music - Summer Song. Jonas Brothers, Miley Cyrus, Demi Lovato, and Fifth Harmony receives the most wins with 2.

Winners and nominees

1999

2000s

2010s

References

Summer Song
Song